The James Monroe Houses or Monroe Houses are a housing project in Soundview, Bronx, New York City. The project consists of twelve buildings, 8, 14, and 15-stories tall with 1,102 apartment units. The 18.49-acre Bronx development is bordered by Soundview, Story, Taylor and Lafayette Avenues. It is owned and managed by New York City Housing Authority (NYCHA). It was completed on November 2, 1961 and named after the fifth President of the United States, James Monroe.

Notable residents 
Wesley Snipes (born 1962), actor and martial artist
Ed Pinckney (born 1963), former NBA player and assistant coach of the Minnesota Timberwolves

References

Public housing in the Bronx
Residential buildings in the Bronx
Soundview, Bronx